Iván Zarco Alvarez (born 8 February 1984) is a Honduran long-distance runner. In 2020, he competed in the men's race at the 2020 World Athletics Half Marathon Championships held in Gdynia, Poland. In the 2020 Tokyo Olympic Games he represented Honduras in the marathon, and finished in 76th place, the last of all competitors who reached the finish line.

He represented Spain until the end of 2019 and, as of 1 January 2020, he represents Honduras in international competitions. In 2020, at the World Athletics Half Marathon Championships in Gdynia he set a Honduran national record in half-marathon, finishing the race at 1:04.08. Zarco made headlines in March 2021, when he was scheduled to run a marathon in Dresden but instead gave his number to the former compatriot Camilo Santiago who ran as Zarco and finished in 2:17.46, which would have been a new record of Honduras. Santiago was swiftly discovered and disqualified for two years; the sanction was annulled in August 2021 by the Administrative Court. Zarco was not sanctioned, since no obvious motive was discovered in his actions.

Competition record

References

External links 
 

Living people
1984 births
Honduran male long-distance runners
Athletes (track and field) at the 2020 Summer Olympics
Olympic athletes of Honduras
Honduran male marathon runners
Olympic male marathon runners